The first USC&GS Davidson was a launch in service with the United States Coast and Geodetic Survey from 1933 to 1935.

Davidson was built by the Luders at Stamford, Connecticut, in 1925 for the United States Coast Guard. The Coast and Geodetic Survey acquired her in 1933, named her Davidson, and placed her in service that year. The Survey returned her to the Coast Guard in 1935.

References
NOAA History, A Science Odyssey: Tools of the Trade: Ships: Coast and Geodetic Survey Ships: Davidson

Ships of the United States Coast and Geodetic Survey
Survey ships of the United States
Ships built in Stamford, Connecticut
1925 ships